Mommenheim is a commune in the Bas-Rhin department. The department is in the historic Alsace region of France, and is itself within the Grand Est administrative region of north-eastern France.

Landmarks
The handsome nineteenth century synagogue survived the war and can be seen at the Rue des Juifs.

See also
 Communes of the Bas-Rhin department

References

Communes of Bas-Rhin